Clay Cross Zingari F.C. was an English football club, based in Clay Cross, Derbyshire.

History
The club competed in the FA Cup twice before merging with Clay Cross Works in 1909 to form Clay Cross Town F.C. but another club by the same name was found competing in the FA Cup during the 1920s.

Records
FA Cup
 Preliminary round – 1922–23

References

Defunct football clubs in Derbyshire
Defunct football clubs in England
Association football clubs disestablished in 1909